Il profeta (internationally released as Mr. Kinky and The Prophet) is a 1968 Italian comedy film directed by Dino Risi.

Plot 
Pietro Breccia (Vittorio Gassman) is a man who has long decided to abandon civilization, becoming a hermit, leaving behind the strain of modern life and the futility of consumer society, living for years in seclusion on Monte Soratte, near Rome. One day he is discovered by a TV crew that, sniffing the scoop, film a report about him. From that moment, against his will, he gets sucked into civilization.

Cast 
 Vittorio Gassman: Pietro Breccia, the hermit 
 Ann-Margret: Maggie, a hippy 
 Liana Orfei: Albertina, Puccio's sister 
 Fiorenzo Fiorentini: Luigi
 Oreste Lionello: Puccio, Breccia's manager
 Enzo Robutti: Alberto
 Yvonne Sanson: Carla Bagni 
 Carmen Villani

Production
It was one of several films Ann-Margret made in Europe around this time.

References

External links

1968 films
Commedia all'italiana
Films directed by Dino Risi
Films with screenplays by Ruggero Maccari
Films scored by Armando Trovajoli
1968 comedy films
1960s Italian-language films
1960s Italian films